‌
Vedha is a 2008 Indian Tamil language action drama film, directed by R. Nithyakumar starring Arun Vijay and Sheela. The music is composed by Srikanth Deva. The film opened to negative reviews.

Plot
Vijay (Arun Vijay) is crazy about his younger brother Vadhan (Jaivardhan). Then in a college election, he impersonates the police officer on duty, batters a group of goondas, threatens other candidates and forces them to withdraw, only so that brother gets elected. But by this act, Vijay earns the wrath of the local gangster Sathya (Sathyaprakash).

Meantime, Vijay meets Vedha (Sheela) and after a few meetings, both of them develop an affinity towards each other. Simultaneously, Vijay learns that Vadhan is in love. When Vadhan feels hesitant and unsure of success in his love, Vijay elects to help him, as usual. They visit a mall where predictably, Vadhan introduces Vedha as the light of his life. Hiding his disappointment Vijay congratulates his brother and with his convincing dialogues, persuades Vedha to marry Vadhan. The fairy-tale wedding takes place, but a shocking truth revealed during the wedding night shatters the lives of Vijay, Vedha and Vadhan.

Cast
Arun Vijay as Vijay
Sheela as Vedha
Jaivardhan as Vadhan
Karunas
Seetha
Sathyaprakash as Sathya
Bose Venkat
Mayilsamy
Singamuthu
A. C. Murali Mohan
Madhan Bob

Soundtrack
Soundtrack was composed by Srikanth Deva.

Critical reception
Behindwoods wrote "The challenge for director Nitya Kumar and scriptwriter Vasu Baskar must have been how to pull off this tale of complicated relationships without coming across as too moralistic on the one hand and too vulgar on the other. They are able to take the audience through these relationship turns without losing our interest. However, the story is took dark and depressing, leaving an audience tired. The fail fails to grip and entertain you." Indiaglitz wrote "Vedha could have been a far better film had the director focused the subject sharply." Nowrunning wrote "With too much melodrama and too many songs "Veda" can be rated among those run-of the mill flicks which only test the patience of the viewers and assail their sensibility."

References

2008 films
2000s Tamil-language films
Films scored by Srikanth Deva